Goh Si Hou  is a Singaporean former major-general who served as Chief of Army between 2018 and 2022. He is currently serving as the chief executive officer of the Public Utilities Board (PUB).

Education 
Goh attended Hwa Chong Junior College before graduating from University of Cambridge with a Bachelor of Arts (First Class) degree in economics under the Singapore Armed Forces (SAF) Overseas Scholarship as a President's Scholar.

He also completed a Master of Arts degree in international policy studies and a Master of Science degree in management at Stanford University.

Military career 
Goh enlisted in the Singapore Armed Forces (SAF) in January 1997 and served in the Singapore Army as an Artillery officer. In 2019, he succeeded Melvyn Ong as the Chief of Army.

Non-military career 
In 2018, Goh was appointed to be a board member of Housing Development Board (HDB), with the term lasting till 30 September 2020.

On 1 April 2021, Goh was appointed to be a board member of the Public Utilities Board (PUB).. Subsequently on 22 July 2022, he took over as the chief executive officer of the Public Utilities Board (PUB).

Honours 
 Public Administration Medal (Military) (Gold), in 2021
 Public Administration Medal (Military) (Bronze), in 2015
 Singapore Armed Forces Long Service and Good Conduct (20 Years) Medal
 Singapore Armed Forces Long Service and Good Conduct (10 Years) Medal with 15 year clasp
 Singapore Armed Forces Good Service Medal
 Master Parachutist Badge
Thailand Airborne Badge
United States Airborne Badge
Indonesia Airborne Badge

Personal life 
Goh is married with two children.

References 

Living people
Place of birth missing (living people)
Chiefs of the Singapore Army
Alumni of the University of Cambridge
Stanford University alumni
Stanford Graduate School of Business alumni
1979 births
21st-century Singaporean people